Chester-le-Street Rugby Club is a rugby club situated in the town of Chester-le-Street, England, with the clubhouse in the Donald Owen Clarke Centre.

References

External links 
Official Website 

Sport in County Durham
Rugby Club